Wrexham was a rural district in the administrative county of Denbighshire from 1894 and 1974.

The rural district took over the existing Wrexham Rural Sanitary District. It consisted of the following civil parishes:

Abenbury
Acton†
Allington					
Bersham 		
Bieston
Borras Hwfa†
Borras Riffri†
Broughton	
Brymbo  
Burton 
Cefn: created 1895, from part of Ruabon  
Dutton Cacca 
Dutton Diffeith
Dutton y Brain
Erbistock
Erddig					
Erlas					
Esclusham Above 
Esclusham Below
Eyton†
Gourton†
Gresford					
Gwersyllt
Holt					
Llay
Marchwiel
Minera
Pen y Cae: created 1895 from part of Ruabon 
Pickhill† 
Ruabon
Rhosllannerchrugog: created 1895 from part of Ruabon 
Ridley
Royton†
Sesswick†
Stansty†
Sutton

The parishes marked † were abolished by a County Review Order in 1935, and their areas redistributed to other parishes in the rural district and to the borough of Wrexham. at the same time the district was enlarged by the addition of two parishes from the abolished Llangollen Rural District: Llangollen Rural and Llantysilio.	

The rural district was abolished by the Local Government Act 1972 in 1974. Most of the area passed to Wrexham Maelor, with Llangollen Rural and Llantysilio parishes passing to Glyndŵr, both districts in the new county of Clwyd.

Sources
Denbighshire Administrative County (Vision of Britain)

History of Denbighshire
History of Wrexham County Borough
Rural districts of Wales